Allan Jones  is an English association football coach who managed the New Zealand national football team.

Jones coached at Bristol City, Blyth Spartans and Darlington in England, and also managed Bermuda before moving to New Zealand in 1979. Jones first took charge of the New Zealand side in October 1983. New Zealand won 15, drew 9 and lost 16 of his 40 games in charge.

Managerial statistics

References

External links

Year of birth missing (living people)
Living people
Expatriate association football managers in New Zealand
New Zealand national football team managers
English football managers
English expatriate football managers
Darlington F.C. managers
Auckland City FC managers
New Zealand women's national football team managers
Kuwait SC managers
Al Jahra SC managers
Kuwait Premier League managers
English expatriate sportspeople in Kuwait
Al-Rayyan SC managers
English expatriate sportspeople in New Zealand
English expatriate sportspeople in Bermuda
Expatriate football managers in Bermuda
Expatriate football managers in Kuwait
Expatriate football managers in Qatar
Al-Shamal SC managers
Qatar Stars League managers
Bermuda national football team managers